Dmitry Sergeyevich Bessmertny (born 3 January 1997) is a Belarusian footballer who plays for BATE Borisov.

Honours
BATE Borisov
Belarusian Cup winner: 2019–20, 2020–21
Belarusian Super Cup winner: 2022

References

External links

Profile at FC Minsk website 

1997 births
Living people
Footballers from Minsk
Belarusian footballers
Association football midfielders
Belarus international footballers
FC Minsk players
FC BATE Borisov players